Südtondern is an Amt ("collective municipality") in the district of Nordfriesland, in Schleswig-Holstein, Germany.

History
Its seat is in Niebüll. It was formed on 1 January 2008 from the former Ämter Bökingharde, Karrharde, Süderlügum and Wiedingharde, and the municipalities Niebüll and Leck.

In addition to the main seat in Niebüll, there are offices in Leck, Risum-Lindholm and Süderlügum.

Subdivision
The Amt Südtondern consists of the following municipalities:

Achtrup
Aventoft
Bosbüll
Braderup
Bramstedtlund
Dagebüll
Ellhöft
Emmelsbüll-Horsbüll
Enge-Sande
Friedrich-Wilhelm-Lübke-Koog
Galmsbüll
Holm
Humptrup
Karlum
Klanxbüll
Klixbüll
Ladelund
Leck
Lexgaard
Neukirchen
Niebüll
Risum-Lindholm
Rodenäs
Sprakebüll
Stadum
Stedesand
Süderlügum
Tinningstedt
Uphusum
Westre

References

Ämter in Schleswig-Holstein